Bernat Agulló (14-14?) Catalan noblemen, was Paer en cap (mayor) of Lleida, during the Crown of Aragon.

Biography 

Born in Catalonia, Bernat was the nephew of Guillem d'Agulló, and father Joan Agulló. Bernat Agulló, exercise governmental functions, both in the town of Barcelona as in the Valencia.

References 

15th-century Catalan people